
In Taiwan, Fukan are literary supplements in newspapers.

History 
From the 1950s to the early 1990s, the fukan were the main place for publishing literature in Taiwan. Fukan could occupy up to 1/3 of the space of the entire paper. The rise of publishing houses in the early 1990s have shrunk the fukan down to a single page. 

As of 2004, the remaining notable fukans are Renjian (人間) ("human realm") of the China Times and Lianhe fukan of United Daily News.

References
Chang, Yvonne. Literary Culture in Taiwan: Martial Law to Market Law. Ch.6: "Fukan-Based Literary Culture and Middle-Class Fiction." NY: Columbia UP, 2004.

Taiwanese culture